The legislative districts of Zamboanga del Norte are the representations of the province of Zamboanga del Norte in the various national legislatures of the Philippines. The province is currently represented in the lower house of the Congress of the Philippines through its first, second and third congressional districts.

History 

Prior to gaining separate representation, areas now under the jurisdiction of Zamboanga del Norte were represented under the Department of Mindanao and Sulu (1917–1935) and the historical Zamboanga Province (1935–1953).

The enactment of Republic Act No. 711 on June 6, 1952 divided the old Zamboanga Province into Zamboanga del Norte and Zamboanga del Sur and provided them each with a congressional representative. Zamboanga del Norte first elected its separate representative starting in the 1953 elections.

Even after receiving their own city charters, Dapitan and Dipolog remained part of the representation of the Province of Zamboanga del Norte by virtue of Section 80 of Republic Act No. 3811 (June 22, 1963) and Section 86 of Republic Act No. 5520 (June 21, 1969), respectively.

Zamboanga del Norte was represented in the Interim Batasang Pambansa as part of Region IX from 1978 to 1984, and returned two representatives, elected at-large, to the Regular Batasang Pambansa in 1984.

Under the new Constitution which was proclaimed on February 11, 1987, the province was reapportioned into three congressional districts; each elected its member to the restored House of Representatives starting that same year.

1st District 

City: Dapitan
Municipalities: La Libertad, Mutia, Piñan, Polanco, Rizal, Sergio Osmeña Sr., Sibutad
Population (2020): 231,980

Notes

2nd District 

City: Dipolog
Municipalities: Jose Dalman, Katipunan, Manukan, President Manuel A. Roxas, Siayan, Sindangan
Population (2020):  427,956

3rd District 

Municipalities: Baliguian, Godod, Gutalac, Kalawit, Labason, Leon B. Postigo, Liloy, Salug, Sibuco, Siocon, Sirawai, Tampilisan
Population (2020): 387,519

Lone District (defunct)

At-Large (defunct)

See also 
Legislative districts of Mindanao and Sulu
Legislative district of Zamboanga
2002 Zamboanga del Norte's 1st congressional district special election
2019 Zamboanga del Norte local elections

References 

Zamboanga del Norte
Politics of Zamboanga del Norte